Forbidden Cargo is a 1925 American silent drama film directed by Tom Buckingham and featuring Boris Karloff. The film is considered to be lost.

Plot
As described in a film magazine review, Captain Drake's services to the government has gone unrecognized, and he has grown to be a bitter old man. His daughter Polly carries on and becomes the captain of a rum-running schooner, known only as Captain Joe. Jerry Burke of the Secret Service has been assigned to ferret out the illicit traders. He becomes interested in Polly but the young woman's confederate, Pietro Castillano, learns Jerry's identity, so they shanghai him. In a battle between bootleggers and hijackers, Jerry escapes with the young woman to an island. Here they are captured by the gang, but are saved when she signals the marines. Jerry and Polly are then wed.

Cast
 Evelyn Brent as Polly O'Day
 Robert Ellis as Jerry Burke
 Boris Karloff as Pietro Castillano
 Jack Kenny as Minor Role (uncredited)

See also
 List of American films of 1925
 Boris Karloff filmography

References

External links

1925 films
1925 drama films
1925 lost films
Silent American drama films
American silent feature films
American black-and-white films
Films directed by Tom Buckingham
Lost American films
Film Booking Offices of America films
Lost drama films
1920s American films